The Chester Standard is a weekly free newspaper. It is distributed within the Chester area and since NWN Media deregistered from ABC the readership is unknown.

The paper was delivered free to residents, with that ceasing in July 2017 to pick up point collection only around the area. 

It is a sister publication to the Chester Evening Leader, and is produced by NWN Media, part of Gannett.

The UK's Newspaper Society voted the Chester Standard Free Weekly Newspaper of the Year in the North West, North East and Yorkshire 2008.

References

External links
 Chester Standard

Newspapers published in Cheshire
Chester